Tyron Johnson (born January 8, 1996) is an American football wide receiver for the San Francisco 49ers of the National Football League (NFL). He was signed by the Houston Texans as an undrafted free agent in 2019. He played college football at Oklahoma State.

High school career
In his senior year of high school football, Johnson had 94 reception 1,589 yards and 17 touchdowns.
 He was an Academic All-Big Twelve his sophomore and junior years at OSU. He had an impressive Pro Day catching passes from Cornelius and putting up a top 40-yard dash 4.34.

He graduated from Warren Easton High School in New Orleans, Louisiana where he was an All-American and a top receiver recruit at top collegiate football programs.

College career
During his two years at Oklahoma State he had 80 catches 1,288 yards in 26 games. Johnson entered the draft after his junior year at OSU. He was initially signed by LSU out of high school in 2015 but transferred to Oklahoma State.

Johnson played for Oklahoma State University (OSU) including his last year at OSU as a junior with quarterback Taylor Cornelius when he caught 53 passes for 845 receiving yards and seven touchdowns.

Professional career

Houston Texans
On April 27, 2019, Johnson signed a contract with the Houston Texans. He was waived on August 31, 2019

Buffalo Bills
On September 2, 2019, Johnson was signed to the Buffalo Bills practice squad. He was released on September 18.

Houston Texans (second stint)
On September 23, 2019, Johnson was signed to the Houston Texans practice squad, but was released two days later.

Carolina Panthers
On October 2, 2019, Johnson was signed to the Carolina Panthers practice squad. He was released on October 15.

Los Angeles Chargers
On December 3, 2019, Johnson was signed to the Los Angeles Chargers practice squad. He signed a futures contract with the Chargers on December 30, 2019.

On September 5, 2020, Johnson was waived by the Chargers and signed to the practice squad the next day. He was elevated to the active roster on October 3 for the team's week 4 game against the Tampa Bay Buccaneers, and recorded his first career reception in the game, a 53-yard touchdown pass from rookie quarterback Justin Herbert. He reverted to the practice squad after the game on October 5, and was promoted to the active roster on October 9. He played sparingly throughout the season, finishing with 20 receptions in 12 games, but 3 touchdowns, one against the Tampa Bay Buccaneers, Atlanta Falcons and Las Vegas Raiders each.

On August 31, 2021, Johnson was waived by the Chargers.

Jacksonville Jaguars 
On September 1, 2021, Johnson was claimed off waivers by the Jaguars. He played in five games, but only had one reception, before he was waived on November 16.

Las Vegas Raiders 
On November 18, 2021, Johnson was signed to the Las Vegas Raiders practice squad. He was promoted to the active roster on January 8, 2022. He was released on October 7, 2022 and re-signed to the practice squad. He was released on October 22.

Houston Texans (third stint)
On October 25, 2022, Johnson was signed to the Houston Texans active roster. He was waived on November 16.

Cincinnati Bengals
On November 29, 2022, Johnson was signed to the Cincinnati Bengals practice squad.

San Francisco 49ers
On February 6, 2023, Johnson signed a reserve/future contract with the San Francisco 49ers.

References

External links
 Los Angeles Chargers bio
 Buffalo Bills bio
 Oklahoma State Cowboys bio

1996 births
Living people
African-American players of American football
American football wide receivers
Buffalo Bills players
Carolina Panthers players
Cincinnati Bengals players
Houston Texans players
Jacksonville Jaguars players
Las Vegas Raiders players
Los Angeles Chargers players
LSU Tigers football players
Oklahoma State Cowboys football players
Players of American football from New Orleans
San Francisco 49ers players
21st-century African-American sportspeople